Peter Cooke (23 September 1924 – 27 December 2001) was a Kenyan sailor.
He competed in the Finn class at the 1964 Summer Olympic games in Tokyo, Japan.

References
Peter Cooke's profile at Sports Reference.com

1924 births
2001 deaths
Kenyan male sailors (sport)
Olympic sailors of Kenya
Sailors at the 1964 Summer Olympics – Finn